On 19 August 2018 a major earthquake struck with high intensity on the northeast corner of Lombok (Sambelia and Labuhan Lombok settlements) and northwest Sumbawa (Poto Tano settlement) at 22:56 local time, a few km to the east of the series of quakes that had been rocking the area for the past 3 weeks.  It was measured at  6.9 (USGS), at a depth of 25.6 km. The Indonesian BMKG announced that it was a new major earthquake and it was not an aftershock. The earthquake occurred on the same overall structure, the Flores Back Arc Thrust Fault, however according to scientists it happened on a different thrust fault as there are many individual structures within the belt.  There were 14 deaths and 1800 homes have been damaged, half severely, due to this event, including deaths on Sumbawa, following 2 deaths from the previous Lombok quake roughly 24 hours earlier.  Heavy tiles fell from the local mosque, and 143 patients were being treated outdoors in makeshift tents for injuries on Sumbawa.

See also
 5 August 2018 Lombok earthquake
 July 2018 Lombok earthquake

References

External links
 
  – This link covers all the July and August Lombok earthquakes.

2018 disasters in Indonesia
2018 earthquakes
August 2018 events in Indonesia
Earthquakes in Indonesia
West Nusa Tenggara